Government Street is a major road in Victoria, British Columbia.

The street runs from an intersection with Douglas Street, which it runs parallel with, all the way through downtown Victoria.  It terminates at Dallas Road.

Government Street is popular with tourists as many tourist attractions, such as the British Columbia Parliament Buildings, The Fairmont Empress, Royal British Columbia Museum, and Inner Harbour, are located along the road. There are also many restaurants, hotels, and shops along it.  207 Government Street is the location of the Emily Carr House a National Historic Site of Canada.

Roads in Victoria, British Columbia